Andre Agassi was the defending champion, but retired from his semifinals match this year.

Jan-Michael Gambill won the title, defeating Lleyton Hewitt 7–6(7–2), 4–6, 6–4 in the final.

Seeds

Draw

Finals

Top half

Bottom half

References

External links
 Main draw

Singles